Copelatus japonicus is a species of diving beetle. It is part of the genus Copelatus in the subfamily Copelatinae of the family Dytiscidae. It was described by Sharp in 1884.

References

japonicus
Beetles described in 1884